Iñaki Basiloff (born 28 April 2001) is an Argentine Paralympic swimmer who competes in international swimming competitions, he specialises in freestyle swimming.

Career
He has won one gold and six silver medals at the 2019 Parapan American Games and is a three-time World bronze medalist. He also holds the world record in the 200m freestyle S7 which he achieved in March 2022.

Basiloff competed at the 2020 Summer Paralympics where he narrowly missed winning two bronze medals in the 200m individual medley SM7 and his favoured event 400m freestyle S7.

References

2001 births
Living people
People from Neuquén
Paralympic swimmers of Argentina
S7-classified Paralympic swimmers
Argentine male freestyle swimmers
Swimmers at the 2020 Summer Paralympics
Medalists at the 2019 Parapan American Games
Medalists at the World Para Swimming Championships